Amo Handboll are a professional handball team based in Alstermo, Sweden. They are the handball department of the sports club Alstermo IF. The department was formed in 1971 with the help of Allan Myhrberg, Lars-Gunnar Serell, Lars Åberg, Reine Blad och Åke Erlandsson. 

Amo Handboll currently plays in Allsvenskan, the second highest-level Swedish team handball league (after Handbollsligan). Amo Handboll's biggest merit so far is a playoff to Elitserien 2004. After the 2016/2017 season, the handball division broke up with Alstermo IF, and changed name from Alstermo IF Handboll to Amo Handboll.

Naming history

External links

Footnotes

Sport in Kronoberg County
Handball clubs established in 1971
Swedish handball clubs